Protorhopala sexnotata is a species of beetle in the family Cerambycidae. It was described by Johann Christoph Friedrich Klug in 1833. It is known from Madagascar.

References

Pteropliini
Beetles described in 1833